The Bissau-Guinean ambassador in Washington, D. C. is the official representative of the Government in Bissau to the Government of the United States and concurrently accredited in Mexico City and Ottawa.

List of representatives

References 

 
United States
Guinea-Bissau